The George and Elsie Mattis House is a historic house located at 900 West Park Avenue in Champaign. The house was built in 1926; while it was constructed around the frame of a Queen Anne house from 1893, its redesign was so extensive that the 1926 house is effectively a new building. Locally prominent architect George Ramey designed the house in the Georgian Revival style; the English Brothers, a firm known for its commercial and public works throughout the state, built the house. The two-story brick house features quoins at the corners and a limestone belt course between the two floors. The front entrance is flanked by pilasters and topped by a full entablature with an architrave, frieze, and egg-and-dart cornice. Pedimented dormers project from the slate hip roof on all four sides.

The house was added to the National Register of Historic Places on December 7, 2010.

References

Houses on the National Register of Historic Places in Illinois
Georgian Revival architecture in Illinois
Houses completed in 1926
National Register of Historic Places in Champaign County, Illinois
Buildings and structures in Champaign, Illinois
Houses in Champaign County, Illinois